Whitestone Landing was the terminal station on the Whitestone Branch from its opening on August 9, 1886, to the Whitestone Branch's abandonment in February 1932. In June 1892 the station was moved back from the shoreline. On February 15, 1932, the Whitestone Branch was abandoned and all stations on the branch closed.

Whitestone Landing consisted of two tracks with a track fence in between them and two lower level platforms. The northern platform was made of wood and was 420 feet long. The southern platform was made of cinder and was 252 feet long. Also at one of the platforms was a one-story frame passenger depot, which had electric lights, a drinking fountain, was heated by stoves and a bathroom, and a Staff cabin, which was open from September 1913 to October 1926. North of the station was Whitestone Landing Yard, which had 7 sidings.

The station's location is approximately at 154th Street between 9th Avenue and 10th Avenue in Whitestone.

References

External links
Robert Emery Branch Notes Whitestone Branch
Like a Rolling Whitestone Forgotten New York
Long Island Rail Road Whitestone Branch (abandoned) This map depicts the Long Island Rail Road's abandoned Whitestone Branch, in service from 1868 through 1932. The line and stations are georeferenced to within 15' of accuracy, using 1924 aerial survey imagery to match current satellite imagery.
Arrts Archives Whitestone Branch Part Four
Whitestone Branch track map
Images of Whitestone by Jason D. Antos Chapter 3 The Railroad

Former Long Island Rail Road stations in New York City
Railway stations in Queens, New York
Railway stations in the United States opened in 1886
Railway stations closed in 1932
Whitestone, Queens